Ber is a village in Nagaur district, Rajasthan, India. According to the 2011 census of India, it had a population of 1,050 people: 538 men and 512 women.
|local body = gram panchayat (Bakliya)

References

Nagaur district